Botho Hoefer (1880–1958) was a German art director.

Selected filmography
 The Golden Plague (1921)
 Lucrezia Borgia (1922)
 Louise de Lavallière (1922)
 The Evangelist (1924)
 The Hobgoblin (1924)
 Lightning (1925)
 The Dice Game of Life (1925)
 Struggle for the Soil (1925)
 Our Emden (1926)
 The Man in the Fire  (1926)
 My Friend the Chauffeur (1926)
 A Girl of the People (1927)
 Benno Stehkragen (1927)
 Autumn on the Rhine (1928)
 The Insurmountable (1928)
 Youth of the Big City (1929)
 Tempo! Tempo! (1929)
 Hungarian Nights (1929)
 Gentlemen Among Themselves (1929)
 Foolish Happiness (1929)
 The Black Domino (1929)
 The Circus Princess (1929)
 Queen of Fashion (1929)
 The Woman They Talk About (1931)
 The Beggar Student (1931)
 Ways to a Good Marriage (1933)
 Five Suspects (1950)
 The Man Who Wanted to Live Twice  (1950)
 House of Life (1952)
 The Great Temptation (1952)

References

Bibliography
 William B. Parrill. European Silent Films on Video: A Critical Guide. McFarland, 2006.

External links

1880 births
1958 deaths
German art directors
Film people from Berlin